'BlinkBot' is a wearable glasses system that detects wearer's gaze and blink and use it to command a robot.  The system is developed by Pranav Mistry of MIT Media Lab and Kentaro Ishii of JST.

References

External links
BlinkBot project page
BlinkBot video demonstration
BlinkBot ACM Publication 'Blinkbot: look at, blink and move'

MIT Media Lab
Eyewear